The 2023 Big East Men's Basketball Tournament was the postseason collegiate men's basketball tournament for the Big East Conference that took place from March 8 through March 11, 2023, at Madison Square Garden in Manhattan (New York City). The winner received the conference's automatic bid to the NCAA Tournament.

Seeds 
All 11 Big East schools participated in the tournament. Teams were seeded by the conference record with tie-breaking procedures to determine the seeds for teams with identical conference records. The top five teams received first-round byes. Seeding for the tournament was determined at the close of the regular conference season.

Schedule

Bracket 

* denotes overtime period</onlyinclude>

References 

Tournament
Big East men's basketball tournament
Basketball competitions in New York City
College basketball tournaments in New York (state)
Sports in Manhattan
Big East men's basketball tournament
Big East men's basketball tournament
2020s in Manhattan